Polyplex() is an Indian Multinational company which manufactures Biaxially Oriented Polyester (BOPET) Film for packaging, electrical and other industrial applications.

The company has established itself as one of the most profitable producers of PET Film by way of cost efficient operations resulting from high productivity and low overheads. Its products have gained wide acceptance in the global markets, such as the United States, Europe, Southeast Asia, South America and Australia, where the company has been consistently exporting a substantial part of its production.

Manufacturing facilities
It has manufacturing facilities in India, Thailand, Turkey, the US and Indonesia.

With its headquarters in NOIDA, adjoining New Delhi the company has six manufacturing facilities through its own operations and its subsidiaries:
 In Khatima, in the state of Uttarakhand, India
 In Bajpur, in the state of Uttarakhand, India
 In Rayong province, Thailand (operated by a subsidiary)
 In Tekirdağ, Turkey (operated by a subsidiary)
 In Decatur, Alabama in the USA (operated by a Subsidiary)
 In Serang, Banten in Indonesia (operated by a subsidiary)

References

Chemical companies of India
Packaging companies of India
Manufacturing companies based in Noida
Indian companies established in 1984
Chemical companies established in 1984
1984 establishments in Uttar Pradesh
Companies listed on the National Stock Exchange of India
Companies listed on the Bombay Stock Exchange